Boris Yeltsin: From Dawn to Dusk (sometimes translated to English as Boris Yeltsin: From Dawn till Dusk) is a 1997 memoir book by Aleksandr Korzhakov, former head of Boris Yeltsin's security. In it Korzhakov describes eleven years of his service and the personality of his patron, first president of Russia. Yeltsin is portrayed as a heavy-drinker who hides his health problems. 
Yeltsin and Korzhakov split acrimoniously when Yeltsin fired him in June 1996.

In 2004 next part of the book Boris Yeltsin: From Dawn to Dusk. Afterword was published.

References

Footnotes

Biographies about politicians
1997 non-fiction books
Political books
Russian memoirs
Boris Yeltsin